The NWA Oriental Tag Team Championship was a professional wrestling tag team championship recognized by the National Wrestling Alliance through its partnership with the Korean Pro Wrestling Association.

Title history

See also 
 List of National Wrestling Alliance championships
 NWA Oriental Heavyweight Championship

References

External links 

 Wrestling-Titles.com

National Wrestling Alliance championships
Tag team wrestling championships
Recurring sporting events established in 1982
Recurring events disestablished in 2004